The Challenge de Curling de Gatineau (formerly the Challenge Chateau Cartier de Gatineau and the Challenge Casino Lac Leamy) is an annual bonspiel, or curling tournament, on the World Curling Tour. It is held annually in late October in the City of Gatineau, Quebec. The men's tournament was started in 2009, while the women's tournament was started in 2011, but discontinued after 2013.

Beginning in 2011, the event shifted venues to the Centre Sportif Robert Rochon in Masson, Quebec in the Masson-Angers sector of the city and the Buckingham Curling Club in the Buckingham sector.

Past champions
Only skip's name is displayed.

Men

Women

Open
The open event is part of the Ontario Curling Tour only and is open to teams with men and women.

Past events

2009 event
Former Brier champion Jean-Michel Ménard defeated 2007 Canada Games curling silver medalist Neil Sinclair to win $8,000 for his team. The total pot was $31,000.

Playoffs

2010 event
The total purse of the 2010 event is $37,500. The winner, Serge Reid, upset defending championship Jean-Michel Ménard and earned the right to play at the 2010 Canada Cup of Curling.

Playoffs

References

External links
Official site

World Curling Tour events
Sport in Gatineau
Curling in Quebec
Ontario Curling Tour events
2009 establishments in Quebec
Recurring sporting events established in 2009